Ruth Johnston (born 28 February 2003) is an Australian cricketer who plays for Queensland Fire in the Women's National Cricket League (WNCL) and Hobart Hurricanes in the Women's Big Bash League (WBBL). An all-rounder, she bats right-handed and bowls right-arm medium pace. Johnston was called up to the Queensland squad during the 2020–21 WNCL, and while she did not play she was signed on a full contract ahead of the following season. She was signed by Hobart Hurricanes for the 2021–22 WBBL and made her debut in the side's opening game, a 6-wicket loss to Melbourne Renegades in which she scored 20 runs opening the batting. She is the cousin of her Queensland teammate Ellie Johnston.

References

External links

Ruth Johnston at Cricket Australia

2003 births
Living people
Australian women cricketers
Hobart Hurricanes (WBBL) cricketers
Queensland Fire cricketers
Place of birth missing (living people)